Scotinotylus bicavatus is a species of sheet weaver found in the United States. It was described by Millidge in 1981.

References

Linyphiidae
Spiders of the United States
Spiders described in 1981